Never Let Me Go is the eighth studio album by British alternative rock band Placebo, recorded between 2019 and 2021 and released on 25 March 2022. The album was made available for pre-order on 9 November 2021.

It is Placebo's first studio album in over eight years, following 2013's Loud Like Love. It is also their first album to be recorded as a duo, following the departure of drummer Steve Forrest in 2015. Concurrent with the album announcement, on 4 November 2021, the band revealed a 2022 headline tour of Europe and the United Kingdom.

The first single from the album was "Beautiful James", released on 16 September 2021. The second single, "Surrounded by Spies", was released on 9 November 2021. The third single, "Try Better Next Time" was released on 11 January 2022. The fourth and final single, "Happy Birthday in the Sky", was released on 4 March 2022.

The album achieved strong chart performance, peaking at # 1 in the UK Indie Chart, # 1 in the Austrian, Dutch, and German album charts, and # 3 in the UK Albums Chart.

Critical reception
Never Let Me Go received positive reviews. At Metacritic, which assigns a normalised rating out of 100 to reviews from mainstream critics, the album received an average score of 78, which indicates "generally favorable reviews", based on 13 reviews. NME gave the album 4 stars, stating it was a return to form for the band, and their best since 2006's Meds. In Under The Radar, Jimi Arundell commented "It’s good to hear that they’re still around and continuing to push themselves, though perhaps just not far enough"

Track listing

Personnel

Placebo
Brian Molko – vocals, electric guitar, drum machine, keyboards, loops, percussion, synthesizer, whip, production, creative direction
Stefan Olsdal – electric bass, electric guitar, keyboards, piano, synthesizer, background vocals, production, engineering

Additional personnel
Adam Noble – production, mixing, engineering (all tracks); programming (1, 3–12)
William Lloyd – engineering (all tracks), programming (4–6, 8, 11, 12), keyboard programming (10)
Robin Schmidt – mastering
Matthew Lunn – drums (1, 3, 8, 9)
Pietro Garrone – drums (1–7, 10–12)
Cody Jet Molko – background vocals (7)
Phil Lee – creative direction, design
Rachel Bungey – design
Stuart Ford – design
Mads Perch – band photo

Charts

Weekly charts

Year-end charts

References

2022 albums
Placebo (band) albums